The Pikes Peak Ascent and Marathon is a trail running competition that begins at the base of Pikes Peak, in Manitou Springs, Colorado, and climbs over 7,815 feet (2382 m) to the top of the 14,115 foot (4302 m) peak.  Since 1956, the event takes place each year in late summer, with the Ascent taking place on Saturday (slightly longer than a half-marathon, at 13.3 miles), and the round-trip marathon on Sunday.

History

On August 10, 1956, Dr. Arne Suominen of Del Ray Beach, Fla., challenged smokers and nonsmokers to race up and down Pikes Peak, a  race, in conjunction with the 150th anniversary of the discovery of America's most famous mountain by Zebulon Montgomery Pike. He enlisted 58-year-old real-estate salesman and holistic-lifestyle practitioner Rudy Fahl as the race director. The 56-year-old Suominen, a Finnish former marathon champion and outspoken critic of tobacco, wanted to prove that smoking diminished one's physical endurance. Of the 13 runners that accepted the challenge, only three were smokers. Lou Wille, champion of two Pikes Peak races in the late 1930s and a two-pack-a-day smoker, was likely to be the biggest threat to Suominen's hypothesis. . . .

Although he had beaten Suominen to the summit, Wille was disqualified for not finishing the race. In fact none of the smokers completed the round trip. "I think I've proven my point," Suominen said afterwards. "I finished the race and none of the smokers did." . . .

It was widely rumored that Jecker's motivation came from an American Tobacco Association offer to reward a victorious smoker with a tidy sum of $20,000.

The Pikes Peak Marathon was the first American marathon to allow female competitors, allowing them from the beginning of the marathon in 1956, although no woman entered until 1958. In 1959, Arlene Pieper became the first woman to officially finish a marathon in the United States when she finished the Pikes Peak Marathon. Her daughter, Kathie, aged 9, became the youngest competitor at that time to finish the race to the summit; however, she did not finish the whole marathon.

In 1966 a well-organized marathon was initiated, making the race the third-oldest marathon in the United States. In 1980 a good friend Rudy Faul and fellow runner Carl McDaniel took over as race director; he served as director until 1998 and was named director emeritus in 1999 until his death on August 23, 1999, only one day after the race was held that year.

The Pikes Peak Ascent race has twice incorporated the World Long Distance Mountain Running Challenge competition, first in 2006 then again in 2010.

The 2020 edition of the ascent was cancelled due to the coronavirus pandemic, with all registrants given the option of either transferring their entry to 2021, obtaining a partial refund and priority registration for 2021, or obtaining a full refund.  At the time the ascent was cancelled, the race directors were still hopeful that the marathon could be held, due to the limited number of runners in the marathon and the comparatively lower level of logistics required at the summit, since runners would be making their own way down the mountain.  However, registered marathon runners were also given the same options as those registered for the ascent, should they choose to withdraw from the race.  Eventually, the race organizers announced that the marathon would be held, with coronavirus considerations, including cancelling or paring down related events, requiring masks or other face coverings before and after the race, enforcing social distancing regulations at the start and finish, starting the runners in small waves, and eliminating some aid stations.

Course

Because of the nature of the run (dirt trails, rock, and other natural obstacles) and the high altitude, the race is much more difficult than standard  marathons. Winning times for the marathon are typically just under four hours (compared to elite "flatland" marathon times of just over two hours).  Although the average grade of the slope is 11%, some sections are much steeper because the central portion of the race is relatively flat.  The initial three miles (5 km) are very steep. The central  start as rolling terrain, but become progressively steeper toward the end. The top  are above timberline and require some rock scrambling to reach the summit.  Oxygen levels drop progressively as altitude rises, further compounding the uphill ordeal.

Winning race times differ significantly from year to year, often depending on weather and trail conditions.  Some races have been associated with hot, dry conditions, and others have been associated with snow and cold at the top of the peak.

The race attracts hundreds of runners for both the ascent and for the round-trip. The USDA Forest Service limits the number of runners to 1,800 for the ascent and 800 for the marathon, and the race registration typically fills in one or two days.

Winners

Marathon
The following table shows the official winners of the marathon. Course records are highlighted with green background.

The race was lengthened by 1.1 miles in 1976, so that 7–8 minutes must be added to the pre-1976 times for comparison purposes.

The most successful male and female athletes in the history of the marathon are Matt Carpenter, outright record holder and winner of the marathon on twelve occasions between 1988 and 2011, and Erica Larson, who has won the women's race five times. Carpenter won six times in a row in 2006–2011, as did Steve Gachupin in 1966–1970. Larson won four times in a row in 1999–2002, as did Danelle Ballengee in 1994–1997.

Ascent

The following table shows the official winners of the Ascent. Course records are highlighted with green background. The men's Ascent record was set during the Marathon in 1993 by Matt Carpenter with a time of 2:01:06.

The 2018 Ascent was run on a shortened course of 7.6 miles, finishing at Barr Camp, due to inclement weather being forecast.

See also
Mount Lemmon Marathon

Notes

References

External links
 Official site
 Peak Marathon Course Flyover Map, The Run Scout

Recurring sporting events established in 1966
Marathons in the United States
Foot races in Colorado
Pikes Peak
Tourist attractions in El Paso County, Colorado
Manitou Springs, Colorado
Skyrunning competitions
Skyrunner World Series
Golden Trail Series